Caleb Daniel (born 7 July 1996) is a professional Australian rules footballer who plays for the Western Bulldogs in the Australian Football League (AFL). Known for his precise short kicking from half back, Daniel has been recognised statistically as one of the most effective short kicks in the game. 
When he was recruited in 2014 he was listed as the shortest player (standing at 167 cm) in the AFL, and is one of the few players who regularly wears a protective helmet, having done so since his playing days at junior level.

Early days and career
Daniel was born in Beaudesert, Queensland where he lived until the age of six before moving to Adelaide and studied at Aberfoyle Park High School and played eleven senior games for South Adelaide in the SANFL. He credits his coach at South Adelaide, former Fitzroy and St Kilda rover Brad Gotch, for instilling confidence in him at the start of his senior career.

AFL career

Selection and debut

Daniel was selected by the Bulldogs with pick 46 of the 2014 National Draft. While he was overlooked by other clubs due to his short stature, Simon Dalrymple, the Bulldogs' chief recruiter at the time, had been impressed by Daniel, commenting: "His decision-making stood out, his ball-handling... He can keep on running. And he's got fantastic agility, and when you've got that lateral movement it buys you a bit more time." He made his debut in an 11-point win against  as the starting substitute in round 14 of the 2015 season.

2016: A Memorable Season
After the promise shown in his debut season, Daniel took his game to the next level the following season, playing all but two games due to calf injury and playing a key role in the Bulldogs' drought-breaking premiership. In Round 4 2016, he was the round nominee for the 2016 AFL Rising Star after collecting 25 disposals in a 36-point win against . He would finish runner-up to Sydney's Callum Mills.

2017 season
In February 2017, Daniel signed a two year contract extension with the Western Bulldogs, keeping him at the club until 2019. Daniel had required a shoulder reconstruction after the Western Bulldogs 2016 Premiership, meaning he trained without contact for some time. Daniel played 20 games in the 2017 AFL season, only missing out on rounds 4 and 5, which he spent in the Victorian Football League (VFL). In the 2017 season, Daniel had 12 games where he picked up 20 or more disposals. After being recognised for having a strong season, Daniel came fifth in the Charles Sutton Medal voting for 2017.

2020 season: Best and fairest success
Daniel played every game in the home and away season, having a career best season and being recognised around the league for his impressive performance. Daniel was ranked as the games best ranked general defender according to AFL Player ratings. He was nominated by the Western Bulldogs for the Leigh Matthews Trophy, alongside fellow teammates Marcus Bontempelli and Jack Macrae. He was named in the initial 40-man squad of the 2020 All-Australian team. Daniel made the 22 man final squad, named on the interchange bench.  Daniel's introduction to the All Australian team was not without controversy, with many pundits arguing that a player with such a small stature is limited in their ability to defend and take contested marks.

Daniel won the Western Bulldogs best and fairest award, the Charles Sutton Medal, with a total of 205 votes over the course of the 18 games he played, beating Western Bulldogs captain Marcus Bontempelli by a mere 10 votes.

Statistics
 Statistics are correct to the end of the 2021 elimination final.

|- style="background-color: #EAEAEA"
! scope="row" style="text-align:center" | 2015
|
| 35 || 10 || 6 || 2 || 55 || 76 || 131 || 23 || 22 || 0.6 || 0.2 || 5.5 || 7.6 || 13.1 || 2.3 || 2.2
|-
| scope=row bgcolor=F0E68C | 2016# 
|
| 35 || 24 || 11 || 9 || 279 || 239 || 518 || 89 || 79 || 0.5 || 0.4 || 11.6 || 11.0 || 21.6 || 3.7 || 3.3
|- style="background-color: #EAEAEA"
! scope="row" style="text-align:center" | 2017
|
| 35 || 20 || 5 || 5 || 210 || 224 || 434 || 59 || 57 || 0.3 || 0.3 || 10.5 || 11.2 || 21.7 || 3.0 || 2.9
|-
! scope="row" style="text-align:center" | 2018
|
| 35 || 20 || 4 || 7 || 214 || 206 || 420 || 84 || 63 || 0.2 || 0.35 || 10.7 || 10.3 || 21.0 || 4.2 || 3.15
|- style="background-color: #EAEAEA"
! scope="row" style="text-align:center" | 2019
|
| 35 || 17 || 1 || 0 || 294 || 157 || 451 || 67 || 56 || 0.1 || 0.0 || 17.3 || 9.2 || 26.5 || 3.9 || 3.1
|-
! scope="row" style="text-align:center" | 2020
|
| 35 || 18 || 3 || 2 || 225 || 138 || 363 || 59 || 42 || 0.2 || 0.1 || 12.5 || 7.7 || 20.2 || 3.3 || 2.3
|-
! scope="row" style="text-align:center" | 2021
|
| 35 || 22 || 7 || 1 || 300 || 241 || 541 || 88 || 54 || 0.3 || 0.0 || 13.6 || 10.9 || 24.6 || 4.0 || 2.4
|-
|- class="sortbottom"
! colspan=3| Career
! 131
! 37
! 26
! 1577
! 1281
! 2858
! 469
! 370
! 0.3
! 0.2
! 12.0
! 9.8
! 21.8
! 3.6
! 2.8
|}

Notes

Honours and achievements
Team
AFL premiership: 2016
Individual
AFL Rising Star nominee: 2016
All-Australian team: 2020
Charles Sutton Medal: 2020

References

External links

1996 births
Living people
Western Bulldogs players
Western Bulldogs Premiership players
Australian rules footballers from South Australia
South Adelaide Football Club players
All-Australians (AFL)
Charles Sutton Medal winners
One-time VFL/AFL Premiership players